Mickey's Tale of Two Witches is a Halloween television special that premiered on October 7, 2021 on Disney Junior.

It is first spinoff special of Mickey Mouse Mixed-Up Adventures, though it isn't officially part of the series.

Plot
On Halloween, Mickey tells Pluto a story about two witches-in-training, Minnie the Wonderful and Daisy Doozy, who must pass four tests to graduate from the Witch Academy in Happy Haunt Hills. While Daisy isn’t confident about passing, she and Minnie join forces, along with Count Mickula and the gang, to defeat a mischievous ghost. Minnie and Daisy learn that working together makes their magic and their friendship stronger.

Cast
 Bret Iwan as Mickey Mouse, Count Mickula
 Bill Farmer as Goofy, Franken-Goof & Pluto, Werewolfy Pluto
 Daniel Ross as Donald Duck, Mummy Donald
 Tress MacNeille as Daisy Duck, Daisy Doozy
 Kaitlyn Robrock as Minnie Mouse, Minnie the Wonderful Witch
 Jim Cummings as Pete, Pete the Ghost
 Frank Welker as Figaro & Butch the Bulldog
 Nika Futterman as Cuckoo Loca, Spooky-Loca
 April Winchell as Clarabelle Cow, Witch Master Clarabelle
Additional Voices by Bill Farmer, Daniel Ross, and Frank Welker

Songs
"How to Witch" – sung by Daisy Doozy, Minnie the Wonderful Witch & Witch Master Clarabelle
"The Fright Stuff" – sung by Pete the Ghost
"Spooky Side" – sung by Daisy Doozy & Minnie the Wonderful Witch
"Spooky Spirit" – sung by Count Mickula & the gang

Release 
Mickey's Tale of Two Witches premiered on October 7, 2021 on Disney Junior. It was released on Disney+ on October 8, 2021.

Reception

Critical response 
Brett White of Decider included Mickey's Tale of Two Witches in their "Best Halloween Movies, TV Episodes and Specials To Stream on Disney+" list. Casey Suglia and Sydni Ellis of Romper ranked the film 39th in their "40 Of The Best Halloween Movies To Stream On Disney+" list, and called the Halloween special "cute," writing, "It features fun songs, magic spells, a mischevious ghost, and plenty of Halloween fun."

Ratings 
On its premiere airing on Disney Junior at 7:00 p.m., the special was watched by 0.35 million viewers. The special was broadcast again the next day on Disney Channel at 9:30 a.m. and was watched by 0.30 million viewers.

Accolades

References

External links
 
 

2020s American television specials
2020s animated television specials
2021 television specials
2021 in American television
Disney television specials
Disney Junior television specials
Halloween television specials
Mickey Mouse
Television specials by Disney Television Animation
Witchcraft in television
2021 animated films
American children's animated comedy films
American children's animated adventure films
American animated horror films
Films about witchcraft
American supernatural horror films